Joshua Bluhm (born 11 September 1994) is a German bobsledder.

Bluhm competed at the 2014 Winter Olympics for Germany. He teamed with driver Thomas Florschütz, Kevin Kuske and Christian Poser as the Germany-3 sled in the four-man event, finishing 7th.

Bluhm made his World Cup debut in January 2014. As of April 2014, he has two World Cup podium finishes, a pair of bronze medals in 2013–14.

World Cup podiums

References

External links
 

Joshua Bluhm at the Bob- und Schlittenverband für Deutschland 

1994 births
Living people
German male bobsledders
Olympic bobsledders of Germany
Bobsledders at the 2014 Winter Olympics
Sportspeople from Kiel